Griffin Creek may refer to:

Griffin Creek (Alberta), a stream in Alberta
Griffin Creek (Flathead County, Montana), a stream in Montana
Griffin Creek (Bear Creek tributary), a stream in Oregon